NJN News was a half-hour daily broadcast television news program by the New Jersey Network which also aired in New York City on WNET Monday through Friday.  It was sometimes preempted on holidays by special programming.

The program began in 1978 as New Jersey Nightly News, co-produced with WNET, although WNET also continued to air the newscast. In 1981, NJN assumed full control of the broadcast. NJN News had its final broadcast on June 30, 2011, when NJN went off the air to be replaced by NJTV, now known today as NJ PBS. 

Talent included former presenter Kent Manahan, news anchor Jim Hooker, environmental reporter Ed Rodgers, science reporter Patrick Regan, health reporter Sara Lee Kessler, and general reporters Marie DeNoia Aronson, Kent Saint John and others.

References

External links
 official NJN News website
Local news programming in the United States